Sahabat Alam Malaysia (english: "Friends of Nature Malaysia", also known as SAM) is a Malaysian NGO established in 1977 to fight for causes related to the Malaysian environment. SAM joined Friends of the Earth International (FoEI) in 1983, and also publishes books and news magazines. SAM's role includes campaigns on pollution, land use, deforestation, fisheries, energy, water, dams, agriculture, indigenous rights and tourism. Its current President is Meenakshi Raman. It is based in Penang and Sarawak.

See Also
 FoEI
 Third World Network
 Consumers Association of Penang

References 

Non-governmental organizations
Environmental organisations based in Malaysia
Environmental organizations established in 1977